William Proby, 5th Earl of Carysfort KP (18 January 1836 – 4 September 1909), known as William Proby until 1872, was a British peer.

Carysfort was the fourth son and youngest child of Admiral Granville Proby, 3rd Earl of Carysfort, and his wife Isabella (née Howard), who died only four days after his birth. He was educated at Eton and Trinity College, Cambridge. He served as High Sheriff of Wicklow in 1866 and as Lord-Lieutenant of County Wicklow from 1890 to 1909 and was made a Knight of the Order of St Patrick in 1874. In 1872 he succeeded his elder brother in the earldom and entered the House of Lords.

Lord Carysfort married Charlotte Mary, daughter of Reverend Robert Boothby Heathcote, in 1860. The marriage was childless. He died in September 1909, aged 73, when all his titles became extinct. The Countess of Carysfort died in 1918.

Notes

References 

1836 births
1909 deaths
Alumni of Trinity College, Cambridge
Heathcote family
Knights of St Patrick
Lord-Lieutenants of Wicklow
People educated at Eton College
High Sheriffs of Wicklow
Earls of Carysfort